The Fırtına River bridges are a group of more than 20 well-preserved Ottoman-era bridges over the Fırtına river and its tributaries near Çamlıhemşin in Rize Province at the eastern end of Turkey's Black Sea coast.

Because of the steep-sided valleys and frequent floods, the bridges have characteristically high arches.

Many of the bridges date from the 18th and 19th centuries, but some may be older. It is thought they were built by stonemasons from the local community, working under the direction of central Ottoman authorities.

The bridges include:

Çamlıhemşin Bridge
Kaptanpaşa Bridge, not dated, but 18th- or 19th-century in style, near the village of Yeşiltepe 
Buzlupınar Bridge, not dated, but 19th-century in style, in the village of Buzlupınar
Köprüköy Bridge, date stone unreadable, but 19th-century in style
Şenyuva (Cin Civa) Bridge, dated 1696 or 1699 by an inscription that was lost during a 1946 flood
Mikron Bridge, mid 19th-century; arches, side walls and fill repaired in 1998 
Ardeşen Bridge, late 19th-century construction of dressed and uncut stone, now in poor condition

Several similar bridges in nearby valleys are also notable

Çağlayan Bridge (Fındıklı) 
Güneyce Bridge (İkizdere)
Dörtgözlü Bridge (Pazar)

References

Sources
 
 
 
 
 

Ottoman bridges in Turkey
Buildings and structures in Rize Province
Arch bridges in Turkey